Čika (Zadar, first half of 11th century – Zadar, after 1095; Latin: Chicca) was a Croatian benedictine nun, founder of the benedictine monastery of St. Mary Church in Zadar. She is also known for the illuminated prayer book known as Čika's book of hours, the oldest prayer book for personal use in Europe.

Life
She was the daughter of Dujam and Vekenega, niece of prior Madi, and the wife of Andrija.

She was the member of the noble patrician family Madi. After the death of her husband in 1066, she founded the monastery of St. Mary in Zadar with the help of her family. King Petar Krešimir IV referred to her as his sister when he placed the monastery under the royal protection, though such genealogy is debated.

She is the mother of Vekenega.

References

Cika
Cika